Stuart Neville (born 1972) is a Northern Irish author best known for his novel The Twelve or, as it is known in the United States, The Ghosts of Belfast. He was born and grew up in Armagh, Northern Ireland.

Works
The Twelve was placed on the Best of 2009 lists by both The New York Times and Los Angeles Times. The book has been given full reviews in a number of publications in the United States, Ireland and the United Kingdom, appearing in The New York Times, The Irish Times, Los Angeles Times, Publishers Weekly and The Guardian, among others.

Collusion, the sequel to The Twelve, was published in the United Kingdom by Harvill Secker in August 2010, and in the US by Soho Press in October 2010.  The book was reviewed in New York Journal of Books.

Ratlines was published in January 2013 in the US by Soho Crime.  It was reviewed in New York Journal of Books.

Critic
Stuart Neville has written review essays and book reviews for the Irish Times and Irish Independent.

Awards and nominations
The Ghosts of Belfast, the American edition of The Twelve, won the Mystery/Thriller category of the Los Angeles Times Book Prize in April 2010. It also won the New Voice category of the 2010 Spinetingler Awards, and was nominated for the 2010 Dilys Award, Anthony Award, Barry Award, and Macavity Award.

Bibliography

Novels

The Twelve (2009; published in the United States in 2012 as The Ghosts of Belfast)
Collusion (2010)
Stolen Souls (2012)
Ratlines (2013)
The Final Silence (2014)
Those We Left Behind (2015)
So Say the Fallen (2016)
Here and Gone (writing as Haylen Beck) (2017)
Lost You (writing as Haylen Beck) (2019)
The House of Ashes (2021)

Short Stories

Requiems for the Departed (2010; co-contributor to short story collection)
''The Traveller and Other Stories" (2020; collection of short stories)

References

Male writers from Northern Ireland
Irish male novelists
Irish mystery writers
21st-century Irish novelists
21st-century writers from Northern Ireland
21st-century British male writers
Living people
1972 births